Tahunabad (also Romanized as Tāhūnābād, Ţāḩūnābād, and Tāḩūnābād) is a village in Jeyhun Dasht Rural District, Shara District, Hamadan County, Hamadan Province, Iran. At the 2006 census, its population was 69, in 23 families.

References 

Populated places in Hamadan County